Voyage is the 1977 self-titled debut album by French disco group, Voyage.  The songs on the album paid a nodding homage to musical styles of different regions of the world, as if the band and its listeners were taking a jet set trip around the world.

As was the case with a number of disco albums during the 1970s, all cuts of Voyage's debut release made it to number one on the U.S. disco chart.  In Voyage's case, they went to number one on the disco chart with their debut release for three weeks.  Although no cuts made the US pop singles chart, the single "From East to West" peaked at number 85 on the soul singles chart. "From East to West" went to number 13 on the UK Singles Chart.

Track listing
Side A
 "From East to West" - 7:08
 "Point Zero" - 4:38
 "Orient Express" - 5:00

Side B
 "Scotch Machine" - 3:28 (known as "Scots Machine" in the UK to avoid causing offence in Scotland)
 "Bayou Village" - 1:51
 "Latin Odyssey" - 4:48
 "Lady America" - 6:57

Charts

Personnel

 Arranged By – Marc Chantereau, Pierre-Alain Dahan & Slim Pezin
 Bass, Other (Patience, Kindness) – Sauveur Mallia
 Drums & Percussion – Pierre-Alain Dahan
 Engineer (Mixing) – Stephen W. Tayler
 Engineer – Paul Scemama
 Engineer (Trident Studios) – Peter Kelsey, Stephen W. Tayler
 Country Fiddle – Roger Churchyard
 Guitar & Percussion – Slim Pezin
 Keyboards & Percussion – Marc Chantereau
 Photography By (Cover) – Morton Beebe
 Pipe – David Milner, Ian Craig, Roddy McDonald
 Producer – Roger Tokarz
 Synthesizer – Georges Rodi
 Vocals – Bernard Ilous, Bobby McGee, Pierre-Alain Dahan, Slim Pezin, Cella Stella, Ekambi Brillant, Marc Chantereau, Emmanuelle Bale, Francine Chabot, Georges Costa, Kay Garner, Michael Costa, Stephanie de Sykes

References

External links
 https://musicbrainz.org/release-group/d6c7db16-38dd-4a16-8188-dc94dc0f5e3b
 https://www.discogs.com/Voyage-Voyage/master/6614

1977 debut albums
Voyage (band) albums
Albums recorded at Trident Studios